Vincetoxicum polyanthum is a vine in the dogbane family Apocynaceae. It is known as coast tylophora. The species was first described in 1891 by Otto Kuntze. It has been placed in the genus Tylophora, now synonymous with Vincetoxicum. It is native to Australia: New South Wales, the Northern Territory, and Queensland.

References 

polyanthum
Plants described in 1891
Flora of New South Wales
Flora of the Northern Territory
Flora of Queensland